The Crystal Turandot Awards are Russian theatre awards created in 1991. They are awarded at the Vakhtangov Theatre in Moscow, where the winner receives a crystal figurine of Princess Turandot, the main character of Turandot, a play first staged at the theatre in 1922.

It has been described as the highest theatre prize of Moscow.

Past winners
In 1993, dancers Ekaterina Maximova and Vladimir Vasiliev won the award for theatre arts. Theatre and film director Pyotr Fomenko won an award.
In 1997/8, Dmitry Nazarov was awarded Best Actor, for playing Satin in the play TSATRA.
In 2008, Boris Messerer won a Crystal Turandot.
 In 2010, Armenian actor Armen Dzhigarkhanyan won the award.
In 2012, Vakhtangov Theatre's oldest actress, 96-year-old Galina Konovalova, was honoured with the award in the Honour and Dignity category. Actor Valentin Gaft also received an award.
In 2016, Vladimir Simonov was awarded the prize.

References

Russian theatre awards